Bridesmaid are an instrumental stoner rock band from Columbus, Ohio consisting of two bass players and two drummers.

History
Founded in 2010, the band was initially a trio. The original members were Bob Brinkman and Scott Hyatt on bass guitars and Cory Barnt on drums. Barnt eventually moved and during the transition period both Ricky Thompson and Barnt were drummers and the larger sound inspired Brinkman and Hyatt to keep two drummers. Adam Boehm was added when Barnt left.

Eventually, Thompson left and Barnt returned maintaining the two bass and two drums lineup.

Band members
Current
Bob Brinkman, bass
Scott Hyatt, bass
Cory Barnt, drums
Adam Boehm, drums

Past
Ricky Thompson, drums

Discography
Splits and Compilations
Sun Splitter/Bridesmaid Split 7" (2011)
Heavy Haze Wax Mage Records Collection 1 (2016)

EPs
Davy Jones Industrial Average (2011)

Full-length LPs
Breakfast At Riffany's (2013)
International House Of Mancakes (2016)

References

External links
Bridesmaid at Bandcamp
Bridesmaid at Facebook
Bridesmaid at Blogspot

Musical groups from Columbus, Ohio
Musical quartets
American instrumental musical groups